"Little Girl" is a song written by Kendal Franceschi and Quentin Powers, and recorded by American country music artist Reba McEntire.  It was released in December 1989 as the third single from the album Sweet Sixteen.  The song reached number 7 on the Billboard  Hot Country Singles & Tracks chart.

Chart performance

Year-end charts

References

1989 singles
Reba McEntire songs
Song recordings produced by Jimmy Bowen
MCA Records singles
Songs written by Kendal Franceschi
1989 songs